Daniel Luke Pilkington (born 25 May 1990) is an English semi-professional footballer who plays as a winger. He previously played for Atherton Collieries, Kendal Town, Chorley, Stockport County, York City, Kidderminster Harriers, Hereford United, Barrow and Stalybridge Celtic.

Career
Born in Blackburn, Lancashire, Pilkington is the younger brother of Irish international footballer Anthony Pilkington. He started out with Myerscough College, which has a reputation for developing football talents, before playing for Atherton Collieries, Kendal Town and Chorley. He signed for Stockport County on a professional contract 3 July 2008 to progress in their under-21 Development squad. He made his debut as a substitute against Hereford United on 31 January 2009. He left Stockport at the end of January 2011 after his contract was cancelled by mutual consent.

He went on trial with Chesterfield and scored against Alfreton Town in a pre-season friendly on 15 July 2011 in a 4–1 win, although he was not offered a contract by the club. Pilkington signed for Conference Premier club York City on non-contract terms on 19 August 2011 following a trial. After coming on as an 89th-minute substitute for Jason Walker to make his debut away at Kettering Town on 23 August 2011, he scored a goal in the 94th minute to finish the game at 5–1. His first start for York came on 13 September 2011 against Bath City in a 1–0 victory at home. He finished the 2011–12 season with 22 appearances and two goals for York, but was not involved in the side's successful play-off campaign.

Pilkington signed a one-year contract with Conference Premier side Kidderminster Harriers on 19 June 2012 after his contract with York expired. He made his debut in Kidderminster's 1–0 win over Lincoln City on 11 August 2012, before scoring his first goal in a 1–1 draw away to Barrow on 1 September. He signed for Conference Premier rivals Hereford United on 19 June 2013.

Pilkington signed for Conference North team Barrow on 16 July 2014.

Career statistics

References

External links

Danny Pilkington profile at Barrow A.F.C.

1990 births
Living people
Footballers from Blackburn
English footballers
Association football wingers
Atherton Collieries A.F.C. players
Kendal Town F.C. players
Chorley F.C. players
Stockport County F.C. players
York City F.C. players
Kidderminster Harriers F.C. players
Hereford United F.C. players
Barrow A.F.C. players
Stalybridge Celtic F.C. players
English Football League players
National League (English football) players
English people of Irish descent